The Night of the Bottle Fight was an incident that took place in the Empire of Brazil in 1831. The event involved the Portuguese that supported the Emperor Dom Pedro I and the Brazilians that opposed him. It was one of the main events from the period that immediately preceded the monarch's abdication (in April 1831).

History 
The Night of the Bottle Fight involved a riot that occurred in opposition to Pedro I (then emperor of Brazil). In 1830, prior to the Night of the Bottle Fight, Líbero Badaró, a liberal journalist, was assassinated in São Paulo for denouncing Pedro I's policies. The perpetrators were allied with the emperor's politicians. The assassination unleashed a wave of protests against Pedro I's government.

Opposition continued in February 1831, when Pedro I travelled to Minas Gerais and was received with hostility by the locals. The conflict reached its climax on the night of February 13, when, during a party for the emperor's reception organized by his Portuguese supporters, Brazilians attacked with stones and bottles. This involved a dispute between allies from the Portuguese party that favored the emperor, and liberals from the Brazilian party who opposed him. This episode played an important role in the political crisis that resulted in the abdication of Dom Pedro I on 7 April 1831.

References 

Conflicts in 1831
Empire of Brazil
1831 in Brazil